Chehel Sotoun, a Safavid pavilion located in Qazvin which stands amid gardens in the central square of the old city and in which the Qazvīn museum is installed.

References

Further reading

External links

Chehel Sotoun Qazvin at irantourismcenter.com

Qazvin
Buildings and structures in Qazvin Province